Craig Simpson is a former football (soccer) player who represented New Zealand at international level.

Simpson played two official A-international matches for the New Zealand in 1986, both against Pacific minnows Fiji, the first a 4–1 win on 17 September, the second two days later a 2–1 win on 19 September 1986.

References 

Year of birth missing (living people)
Living people
New Zealand association footballers
New Zealand international footballers
Association football midfielders